José Gilberto López Acosta (born October 10, 1994, in Culiacán, Sinaloa) is a professional Mexican footballer who currently plays for Gavilanes de Matamoros.

References

External links
 

1994 births
Living people
Mexican footballers
Association football defenders
Dorados de Sinaloa footballers
Loros UdeC footballers
Gavilanes de Matamoros footballers
Liga MX players
Ascenso MX players
Liga Premier de México players
Footballers from Sinaloa
Sportspeople from Culiacán